The Makedonitissa Tomb is a military cemetery and war memorial west of Nicosia, at Engomi in the area of .

This is the location where one Greek Nord Noratlas was shot down by friendly fire on 22 July 1974, during Operation "Niki". "Niki" was a military operation of the Greek Armed Forces to airlift a battalion of Greek commandos to Cyprus in order to reinforce the Cypriot National Guard against Turkish invasion forces.

This tomb is the resting place of Greek Cypriot and some Greek officers and soldiers who were killed during the Turkish invasion.

References

Military cemeteries
Tombs in Cyprus
Turkish invasion of Cyprus
Buildings and structures in Nicosia District